Samantha Buck and Marie Schlingmann are film writers and directors who have made five films together. Buck is also an actress and has directed the documentary Best Kept Secret solo. They are best known for the 2019 film Sister Aimee.

Personal life and education
Buck and Schlingmann are married, having met at Columbia University. Both have a Master of Fine Arts in film from Columbia, and it is in this program that they created their first short films together. The pair have won various grants for female directors. Schlingmann is from Berlin, and though she is German, she writes screenplays in English, saying that her "creative brain" is in this language.

Career
In her acting career, Buck played Det. G. Lynn Bishop in Law & Order: Criminal Intent and Amy on the comedy series Stella. She became interested in film production when starring on Big Apple; the showrunner made the cast take writing workshops and encouraged her talents. She explained that it took her several years after this to follow through, because at the time there were very few actresses who had made the transition to behind the camera. She did not begin with writing, but took up documentary in the cinéma vérité style where she was "basically writing in the edit room with 100 hours of footage". In 2013 she directed the Gotham Award-nominated and Peabody Award-winning documentary film Best Kept Secret. During the production of Best Kept Secret, Buck applied and was accepted to Columbia's film program.

The couple first made films together at Columbia University, directing two award-winning short films: Canary and The Mink Catcher. The latter of these was shown at both Telluride Film Festival and South by Southwest. Their first feature film as a duo was slated to be an adaptation of the young adult novel Need in 2016, as a thriller financed by Covert Media. This year they also began development of the feature film The Big D, something which they were still developing in 2019. Both The Mink Catcher and The Big D are set in Dallas, Texas. Their breakthrough feature came a few years later in 2019's Sister Aimee, which is loosely based on the story of Aimee Semple McPherson. Sister Aimee screened at Sundance Film Festival in 2019, and is planned to have a theatrical run and video on demand release in 2020.

Production filmography

Buck acting filmography

Film

Television

References

External links

Filmmaking duos
Living people
1974 births
People from Dallas
VJs (media personalities)